Edward Barry may refer to:

Sports
Ed Barry (baseball) (1882–1920), American Baseball pitcher
Eddie Barry (ice hockey) (1919–2016), American ice hockey player
Edward Barry (cricketer) (1898–1965), Irish cricketer
Son Barry (1877–1959), Australian rules footballer for Essendon, real name Edward Barry

Others
Eddie Barry (actor) (1887–1966), American actor
Edward Barry (Irish nationalist politician) (1852–1927), member of parliament (MP) for South Cork, 1892–1910
Edward Barry (writer) (1759–1822), English writer
Edward Middleton Barry (1830–1880), English architect
Edward B. Barry (1849–1938), rear admiral of the United States Navy
Edward P. Barry (1864–1936), 44th Lieutenant Governor of Massachusetts
Sir Edward Barry, 1st Baronet (1696–1776), Irish physician and MP for Charleville
J. Edward Barry (1874–1932), mayor of Cambridge, Massachusetts

See also
Barry (name)